Statistics of Turkish First Football League in season 1980/1981.

Overview
It was contested by 16 teams, and Trabzonspor won the championship. 1981–82 European Cup Winners' Cup spot goes to Second League team Ankaragücü, who was also promoted and went back to 1. Lig at the end of the 1980/81 season.

League table

Results

References
Turkey - List of final tables (RSSSF)

Süper Lig seasons
1980–81 in Turkish football
Turkey